William James Robert Peel, 3rd Earl Peel,  (born 3 October 1947), styled Viscount Clanfield until 1969, is a British hereditary peer who was a Conservative peer from 15 May 1973 until October 2006 when, on his appointment as Lord Chamberlain of the Royal Household, he became a crossbench (non-party) member of the House of Lords.

Background and education
Peel is the eldest son of Arthur Peel, 2nd Earl Peel, and Kathleen McGrath, daughter of Michael McGrath. He is a great-great-grandson of Prime Minister Sir Robert Peel. He attended Ampleforth College, and then went on to the University of Tours in France and the Royal Agricultural University, Cirencester.

Career
Peel was a member of the Prince's Council, part of the Duchy of Cornwall, from 1993 to 2006, and Lord Warden of the Stannaries from 1994 to 2006. He was a member of the Nature Conservancy Council, with English Nature, from 1991 to 1996. He was Chairman of the Game Conservancy Trust from 1994 to 2000, then President from 2000 to 2008, and was President of the Yorkshire Wildlife Trust from 1989 to 1996. Peel was also on the Yorkshire Dales National Park Committee for six years and became a Deputy Lieutenant of North Yorkshire in 1998. Peel was elected as one of the 42 Conservative hereditary peers who were to remain in the House of Lords after the House of Lords Act 1999 came into force, he placed 14th in the election with 142 votes. Since July 2006 he has sat as a Crossbench member.

In June 2006, it was announced that Peel would succeed Richard Luce, Baron Luce, as Lord Chamberlain. On 11 October 2006, he kissed hands with The Queen upon his appointment and was invested as a Knight Grand Cross of the Royal Victorian Order (GCVO), and became Chancellor of the Order. On 14 November 2006, Lord Peel was sworn in as a Member of the Privy Council.

In February 2021, Andrew Parker, Baron Parker of Minsmere, was appointed to succeed Peel as Lord Chamberlain. Peel was due to retire at the end of 2020 but extended his notice period as his successor was searched for amid the COVID-19 pandemic. He retired on 31 March.

On 13 April 2021, Peel returned his Wand and Insignia of Office as Lord Chamberlain and the Badge of Chancellor of the Royal Victorian Order on leaving office. At the same time he was invested with the Royal Victorian Chain.

Family
Peel married (1) Veronica Naomi Livingston Timpson (born 21 January 1950) and had 2 children. Their marriage was dissolved in 1987.

 Ashton Robert Gerard Peel, Viscount Clanfield (born 16 September 1976). He married Matilda Rose Aykroyd (born 15 March 1978) in 2004. She is the third daughter and fourth (and youngest) child of second lieutenant of the Coldstream Guards David Peter Aykroyd (born 6 June 1937) and his wife Lydia Huldine Beamish (18 January 1939 – 9 July 2004). Lord and Lady Clanfield have three daughters, Isla, Willa and Florence, and one son, Nicholas.
 Lady Iona Joy Julia Peel (born 18 September 1978). She married Robert Alexander Edward Bowen on 14 May 2005. They have two sons, Max and Charlie, and a daughter, Amelia.

Lord Peel married (2) The Honourable Charlotte Clementine Soames (born 18 July 1954), daughter of Christopher Soames, Baron Soames, and his wife, Mary Churchill, daughter of Sir Winston Churchill, on 15 April 1989 and had 1 child.

 Lady Antonia Mary Catherine Peel (born 1991). She has been engaged since 2021 to Hubert Morant.

Honours

Commonwealth honours

 He has also received the Queen Elizabeth II Version of the Royal Household Long and Faithful Service Medal for 20 years of service to the Royal Family.

Arms

References

External links
The Lord Chamberlain - Royal Household official website
Appointment of Lord Peel as Lord Chamberlain
DodOnline Biography

1947 births
Living people
Alumni of the Royal Agricultural University
Deputy Lieutenants of North Yorkshire
Earls in the Peerage of the United Kingdom
Knights Grand Cross of the Royal Victorian Order
Members of the Privy Council of the United Kingdom
People educated at Ampleforth College
William
English businesspeople
Crossbench hereditary peers
Viscounts Peel
Peel baronets
Hereditary peers elected under the House of Lords Act 1999